Pharanyu Uppala (born 9 June 1991) is a Thai professional footballer who plays as a right-back for Thai League 3 club  Pattaya Dolphins United. He played in the Thai Premier League in 2016 for Pattaya United and in 2017 for Police Tero.

References

External links
 

1991 births
Living people
Pharanyu Uppala
Association football defenders
Pharanyu Uppala
Pharanyu Uppala